The Shady Point School, located on the northeastern edge of the community of Shady Point in Le Flore County, Oklahoma, was built in 1936 as a Works Progress Administration project.  It was listed on the National Register of Historic Places in 1988.

It was built to a standard design of the Oklahoma State Department of Education, from its pattern book.

It is a one-story  building built of cut and roughly coursed sandstone, with hipped roof.

It was one of 48 buildings and 11 structures reviewed in a 1985 study of WPA works in southeastern Oklahoma, which led to almost all of them being listed on the National Register in 1988.

See also
Dog Creek School, another Shady Point area school, also NRHP-listed

References

National Register of Historic Places in Le Flore County, Oklahoma
School buildings completed in 1936
LeFlore County, Oklahoma
Schools in Oklahoma